The Intercontinental Football League (IFL) was a proposed semi-professional American football league in Europe in the early 1970s. The league was spearheaded by Bob Kap, Tex Schramm, and Al Davis, but failed to materialize. The proposed league is credited with "setting the stage" for NFL Europe.

History
By the early 1970s, the National Football League (NFL) was already looking to promote its product abroad. The league had sent players to tour American military bases and hospitals during the Vietnam war. On May 27, 1972, forty-two NFL players (including Dan Pastorini, Bob Hayes, Jim Kiick, Jan Stenerud, Alan Page, Matt Snell and Merlin Olsen) had demonstrated “le rugby Americain” before 8,000 in Paris. NFL Bleu beat NFL Rouge that day, 16-6, in a game that closely followed a script. Two years later, interest in overseas play was revived.

At the June 5, 1974 press conference at NFL headquarters in New York, the teams of the IFL were announced. The IFL was to be divided into two divisions of three teams each. The likely organization would have been for the teams from German speaking nations (Munich, West Berlin and Vienna) to be in one group, and the southern teams (Barcelona, Rome and Istanbul) in another.

The IFL failed to materialize. There are four reasons usually stated:
Europe was not ready for American football.
Competition with the World Football League, which had planned to expand internationally to such cities as Tokyo and Mexico City.
The NFL players’ strike that summer.
The economic recession in the U.S. at that time.

Despite the league's goals, the IFL did not materialize - the Pro Football Researchers Association attributed this failure to Europe not being ready for American football, potential competition with the World Football League (WFL), a players' strike during the summer of 1974, and the recession that had been "gripping the nation". Another factor was the turmoil in Europe in 1974: Turkey had invaded Cyprus, the American ambassador to Cyprus had been assassinated, Basque separatists had assassinated the prime minister of Spain, and terrorist groups like the Red Brigades had engaged in kidnapping. This turmoil led the State Department to meet with NFL commissioner Pete Rozelle; the officials discouraged him from pursuing the league further. The IFL also suffered a potentially fatal blow when Pan American World Airways, who Kap had brought on as a sponsor, pulled out of the project. Ultimately, Rozelle deemed the creation of the league "impractical".

Proposed teams

For the 1975 season
Munich Lions (Germany)
Vienna Lipizzaners (Austria) 
Berlin Bears (Germany)
Rome Gladiators (Italy) 
Barcelona Almogovares (Spain) 
Istanbul Conquerors (Turkey)

New teams for the 1976 season
Paris Lafayettes (France)
Copenhagen Vikings (Denmark)
Rotterdam Flying Dutchmen (Netherlands)
Milan Centurions (Italy)

References

External links
THE FIRST “NFL EUROPE”
The Intercontinental Football League presents: Touchdown in Europe 1976

Defunct American football leagues in Europe